The 2019 Pacific Rugby Premiership Season was the fifth edition of the competition. Life West Gladiators defeated Belmont Shore 36–27 to win the championship.

Standings

Regular season

Round 1

Round 2

Round 3

Round 4

Round 5

Round 6

Round 7

Round 8

Round 9

Round 10

Playoffs

5th Place Final 

 Santa Monica forfeited the match, citing lack of player numbers. San Francisco Golden Gate awarded win.

3rd Place Final

Final

References 

Pacific Rugby Premiership
Pacific Rugby Premiership